The Freedmen massacres were a series of attacks on African-Americans which occurred in the states of the former Confederacy during Reconstruction, in the aftermath of the American Civil War. Many of these incidents were the result of a struggle over political power after emancipated slaves were given the right to vote through the Fifteenth Amendment to the United States Constitution.

These incidents include:
 The Memphis riots of 1866
 The New Orleans massacre of 1866
 The Camilla massacre of 1868
 The Opelousas massacre of 1868 
 The 1868 St. Bernard Parish Massacre of 1868
 The Jackson County War of 1869
 The Meridian race riot of 1871
 The Colfax massacre of 1873
 The Eufaula, Alabama Election riot of 1874
 The Coushatta massacre of 1874
 The Hamburg massacre of 1876
 The Ellenton riot of 1876
 The Wilmington insurrection of 1898

See also
 Black suffrage in the United States
 Enforcement Acts
 Freedmen's Bureau
 Ku Klux Klan
 Reconstruction Amendments
 Reconstruction Era

References

Massacres in the United States
Pogroms
Race-related controversies in the United States
Racially motivated violence against African Americans
Reconstruction Era
Riots and civil disorder during the Reconstruction Era
American freedmen